Peder Nissen (born 22 December 1976) was a former Danish badminton player. Born and raised in Ikast, Nissen began his career in Ikast at the age of six. He was two times been Danish National champion, has been active for 13 years as a coach in his hometown, and in 2013, he took the chairman in Ikast FS.

Achievements

World Junior Championships 
Boys' doubles

European Junior Championships 
Boys' doubles

Mixed doubles

IBF International 
Men's doubles

Mixed doubles

References

External links 
 

1976 births
Living people
People from Ikast-Brande Municipality
Danish male badminton players
Badminton coaches
Sportspeople from the Central Denmark Region